The list of ship commissionings in 1860 includes a chronological list of all ships commissioned in 1860.


References

1860
Ship commissionings